Te Pīhopatanga o Te Upoko o Te Ika (the bishopric of the head of the fish, i.e. the southern part of the north island; aka Te Hui Amorangi..., lit. the synod...) is an Anglican diocese in the lower and western regions of the North Island in Aotearoa, New Zealand. According to a 2001 census, there were approximately 14,000 Maori Anglicans living in the region. Te Upoko o Te Ika (literally the head of the fish) is one of five pīhopatanga, or episcopal units, that comprise Te Pīhopatanga o Aotearoa, the Maori Anglican Church in New Zealand.

There are several rohe, or ministry units, within Te Pīhopatanga o Te Upoko o Te Ika. These are:
 Taranaki-ki-te-Tonga, and
 Taranaki,
 Wainui-a-rua,
 Aotea-Kurahaupo,
 Manawatu-Rangitikei,
 Poneke,
 Te Awakairangi,
 Whitireia.

Bishops
The first bishop, Te Pīhopa o Te Upoko o Te Ika, was Muru Walters, from his consecration on 7 March 1992 until his retirement in 2018 and the administrator manager is Teri-Rori Kirkwood. On 4 May 2019, it was announced that Wai Quayle, Archdeacon of Wairarapa (in Te Pīhopatanga), was to become the next Pīhopa; she took her See with her consecration as a bishop on 12 September at Masterton by Don Tamihere, Archbishop and Primate of New Zealand, Te Pīhopa o Aotearoa and Te Pīhopa o Te Tairāwhiti (with his fellow-Primates Philip Richardson and Fereimi Cama). Quayle was made deacon in 2013 and ordained priest in 2014, by Walters in Masteron.

References

Anglican dioceses in New Zealand